Kausion was an American rap group composed of Cel, Gonzoe, and Kaydo that was signed to Ice Cube's Lench Mob Records in 1995. They released their debut album, South Central Los Skanless, on October 10, 1995. The album peaked at number 37 on the Billboard Top R&B/Hip-Hop Albums and at number 23 on the Billboard Top Heatseekers. The group disbanded in 1996, with their final appearances being a collaboration with fellow Los Angeles-based rap group, Tha Dogg Pound on the song, "I'll Do It" from the Supercop soundtrack and the song, "Lil' Sumpin'" from The Lawhouse Experience, Volume One, in 1997. Kausion's second album, Youth-Anasia, was released on  February 4 2020 via Blokkwise Entertainment. 

Gonzoe died in 2021, after he was shot in Seattle.

Discography

References

Ice Cube
Musical groups established in 1995
Musical groups disestablished in 1997
Musical groups from Los Angeles
Hip hop groups from California
Gangsta rap groups
G-funk groups
1995 establishments in California
1997 disestablishments in California